Henrietta "Heni" Dér (born 17 April 1986) is a Hungarian singer. She is best known for being the lead singer of the Hungarian band Sugarloaf, which started her solo career.

Music career
Heni Dér came to light after she came ninth in the first season of Megasztár. In 2006, she released her first album with the band Sugarloaf, following with a concert DVD in 2008, and in 2009 a documentary about the film, which was shown at a festival in 2011.

A Dal
In late 2013, Heni Dér was one of the names selected to participate in A Dal 2014, the national selection for Hungary in the Eurovision Song Contest, with the song Ég veled – Next please, which progressed only to the semi-finals, being eliminated then. She was again revealed in late 2014 to participate in the 2015 edition, this time with the song Ébresztő. She was eliminated from the heats.

Discography
 Hajnalig még van idő
 Szingli lány
 Minden hozzád hajt
 Barbie
 Luffballon
 Vadvirág
 Dolce Vita

References

1986 births
21st-century Hungarian women singers
Living people